Niels-Ove Mikkelsen (born 13 April 1937) is a Danish former sports shooter. He competed in the skeet event at the 1972 Summer Olympics.

References

External links
 

1937 births
Living people
Danish male sport shooters
Olympic shooters of Denmark
Shooters at the 1972 Summer Olympics
People from Silkeborg
Sportspeople from the Central Denmark Region